Sallybrook is a residential area near the town of Glanmire outside Cork City in Ireland. It is in the townland of Knocknahorgan on the River Glashaboy (Glasa Bhuì).

History
Sallybrook has twenty houses which date back over 150 years, and were originally part of the Smith Barry Estate situated on Fota Island near Cobh, in Cork Harbour. Workmen and their families were permitted to live there until the breaking up of the estate, at which point residents were able to purchase their homes.

19th century maps show the location of Pike Mill (Dyeing) and Sallybrook Mill (Woollen) in the area.

See also
 List of towns and villages in Ireland

References

Towns and villages in County Cork